Rupesh Kumar K. T. (born 31 August 1979) is an Indian badminton player from Kerala, born in Sirpur, Telangana. He is one of India's finest-ever doubles player, with nine successive national titles. He won the silver medal in mixed team event in 2010 Commonwealth Games held in Delhi, and a bronze medal in 2006 Melbourne. He, along with his doubles partner Sanave Thomas, won the BWF Grand Prix title at the 2009 New Zealand Open and 2010 Bitburger Open. He was three times men's doubles gold medalists at the South Asian Games, in 2004 partnered with Markose Bristow, and in 2006 and 2010 with Thomas.

Achievements

South Asian Games 
Men's doubles

BWF Grand Prix 
The BWF Grand Prix had two levels, the BWF Grand Prix and Grand Prix Gold. It was a series of badminton tournaments sanctioned by the Badminton World Federation (BWF) which was held from 2007 to 2017.

Men's doubles

  BWF Grand Prix Gold tournament
  BWF Grand Prix tournament

BWF International Challenge/Series 
Men's doubles

Mixed doubles

  BWF International Challenge tournament
  BWF International Series tournament

References

External links 
 

1979 births
Living people
Racket sportspeople from Telangana
Racket sportspeople from Kerala
Indian male badminton players
Indian national badminton champions
Badminton players at the 2006 Asian Games
Badminton players at the 2010 Asian Games
Asian Games competitors for India
Badminton players at the 2006 Commonwealth Games
Badminton players at the 2010 Commonwealth Games
Commonwealth Games silver medallists for India
Commonwealth Games bronze medallists for India
Commonwealth Games medallists in badminton
South Asian Games gold medalists for India
South Asian Games medalists in badminton
Medallists at the 2006 Commonwealth Games
Medallists at the 2010 Commonwealth Games